Przyborowo may refer to the following places:
Przyborowo, Gniezno County in Greater Poland Voivodeship (west-central Poland)
Przyborowo, Gostyń County in Greater Poland Voivodeship (west-central Poland)
Przyborowo, Podlaskie Voivodeship (north-east Poland)
Przyborowo, Szamotuły County in Greater Poland Voivodeship (west-central Poland)